Dihydroxycholecalciferol may refer to:

 1,25-Dihydroxycholecalciferol
 24,25-Dihydroxycholecalciferol